Đoka Mijatović (1848–1878) was a Serbian socialist, one of the first major socialist figures among Svetozar Marković, Branko Mihajlović, Vasa Pelagić, Dragiša Stanojević, and others, that were important in disseminating socialist ideas in the Balkans. Born in Novi Sad into an affluent family, Mijatović studied in Zurich to become a doctor in medicine but became a lawyer by profession. He joined the United Serb Youth (1866–72), and was part of the organization's left wing, supporting Svetozar Marković's ideas. He became the editor of Jednakost, a socialist newspaper based on the Radenik. He died at 30 years of age, and was buried at the Almaš cemetery in Novi Sad.

References

Sources

19th-century Serbian people
Austro-Hungarian Serbs
Serbian socialists
Politicians from Novi Sad
Socialism in the Principality of Serbia
1848 births
1878 deaths